Charles George Lemons (3 December 1887 – 1952) was an English footballer.

Career
Lemons started his career with Beighton Recreation and joined Scunthorpe & Lindsey United around 1921. He was highly regarded with Scunthorpe, and left the club in May 1921 to join Lincoln City for their first season in the Third Division North. He made 22 appearances and scored four goals for the club before joining York City prior to their first season in the Midland League in August 1922. He spent one season with the club, making 40 appearances and scoring five goals, before leaving for Gainsborough Trinity in July 1923 as it was nearer to his home in Lincolnshire.

References

1887 births
1952 deaths
Date of death missing
Footballers from Sheffield
English footballers
Association football forwards
Scunthorpe United F.C. players
Lincoln City F.C. players
York City F.C. players
Gainsborough Trinity F.C. players
English Football League players
Midland Football League players